The King Willem-Alexander Canal, named after King Willem-Alexander of the Netherlands, is a 6 km long canal in the northeastern Netherlands. The new canal through the Hondsrug is part of the larger Veenvaart project to draw more recreational boaters and tourists to the Veenkoloniën region in the provinces of Drenthe and Groningen.

The canal was originally to be called the Veenkanaal but was renamed on 8 June 2013 in honor of recently enthroned King Willem-Alexander.

References

Canals in the Netherlands
Canals opened in 2013